In mathematics, the Carlson symmetric forms of elliptic integrals are a small canonical set of elliptic integrals to which all others may be reduced. They are a modern alternative to the Legendre forms. The Legendre forms may be expressed in terms of the Carlson forms and vice versa.

The Carlson elliptic integrals are:

The term symmetric refers to the fact that in contrast to the Legendre forms, these functions are unchanged by the exchange of certain subsets of their arguments.

The Carlson elliptic integrals are named after Bille C. Carlson (1924-2013).

Relation to the Legendre forms

Incomplete elliptic integrals

Incomplete elliptic integrals can be calculated easily using Carlson symmetric forms:

Complete elliptic integrals

Complete elliptic integrals can be calculated by substituting φ = π:

Special cases

The integral can then be expressed in terms of elementary transcendental functions.

Properties

Homogeneity

By substituting in the integral definitions  for any constant , it is found that

Duplication theorem

where .

where  and

Series Expansion

that is  etc.

Expressing the integrand in terms of these polynomials, performing a multidimensional Taylor expansion and integrating term-by-term...

The advantage of expanding about the mean value of the arguments is now apparent; it reduces  identically to zero, and so eliminates all terms involving  - which otherwise would be the most numerous.

An ascending series for  may be found in a similar way. This is overcome by treating  as a fully symmetric function of five arguments, two of which happen to have the same value . The mean value of the arguments is therefore taken to be

and the differences ,   and  defined by

Expressing the integrand in terms of these polynomials, performing a multidimensional Taylor expansion and integrating term-by-term as before...

Negative arguments

In general, the arguments x, y, z of Carlson's integrals may not be real and negative, as this would place a branch point on the path of integration, making the integral ambiguous. In these cases the Cauchy principal value (finite part) of the integrals may be of interest; these are

and

where

This may be arranged by permuting x, y and z so that the value of y is between that of x and z.

Numerical evaluation

The duplication theorem can be used for a fast and robust evaluation of the Carlson symmetric form of elliptic integrals
and therefore also for the evaluation of Legendre-form of elliptic integrals. Let us calculate :
Then iterate the series

Therefore,

Evaluating  is much the same due to the relation

References and External links

B. C. Carlson, John L. Gustafson 'Asymptotic approximations for symmetric elliptic integrals' 1993 arXiv
B. C. Carlson 'Numerical Computation of Real Or Complex Elliptic Integrals' 1994 arXiv
B. C. Carlson 'Elliptic Integrals:Symmetric Integrals' in Chap. 19 of Digital Library of Mathematical Functions. Release date 2010-05-07. National Institute of Standards and Technology.
'Profile: Bille C. Carlson' in Digital Library of Mathematical Functions. National Institute of Standards and Technology.

Fortran code from SLATEC for evaluating RF,  RJ, RC,  RD,

Elliptic functions